Vesna Vaško (born 5 May 1971), known by the stage name Vesna Cáceres, is a Czech composer, singer and accordionist.

Background
Vesna Vaško was born in Croatia in a Czech-Slovenian family. She lived in Prague since 1990.

Education
She studied the accordion in Croatia. In 1990, she came to study musicology at Charles University in Prague. In addition to musicology, she studied singing at the Jaroslav Ježek Conservatory, sang in the vocal sextet Prestissimo with Big Band of Radio Prague. In 1993, she represented the Czech Republic in the World Youth Choir.

Career

In 1996, she founded her group Anima Band together with the Mexican guitarist Pablo Ortiz. With Anima, she performed in clubs, at concerts and festivals in the Czech Republic and abroad, with a repertoire that included original arrangements of Brazilian and Latin American music and her own compositions. For four years she moderated the Czech-Spanish program Contacto Latino at Radio 1.

Since the late nineties she has expanded her repertoire to include jazz standards and her own jazz compositions. With a repertoire of swing & bossa she performs at jazz clubs in the Czech Republic and abroad.

In 2004, she began a solo career as a chanson singer interpreting songs to texts by French and Czech poets, as well as her own songs, accompanying on accordion. Since 2004, she has participated in various theatre projects, writing and playing music for theatre performances.

Discography 
 Ánima cum corpo, V.I.V. Production, 1997 
 Písníčky z Jugoslávie, Vaško Music 1998
 Písníčky z Jugoslávie 2, Vaško Music 2000
 Little Prince, demo 2001
 Baile, Vesna, 2002
 V lásce je všechno tajemné, demo, 2004
 Vesna Sings Gershwin, demo, 2004
 5 elementos , Nextera, 2004
 Aquarela do Brasil, Vesna, 2008
 Vzpomínky na Jadran, 2008
 Le bal des fleurs, Vesna, 2013

Theatre 
 Nepřerušená píseň (2004)
 Tonka Šibenice (2004) – Divadlo v Řeznické
 Manželské vraždění (2005) – Divadlo Na Jezerce
 Zlomatka (2006) – Divadlo v Řeznické
 Čtyři polohy a jedna Vesna (2006) – Klub Lávka
 Krvavá svatba (2010) – Divadlo Rokoko

References

1971 births
Living people
Czech composers
People from Sisak
Musicians from Prague
Charles University alumni
Czech people of Slovene descent
Yugoslav emigrants to Czechoslovakia